The Investment Association is the trade body that represents UK investment managers. 

Their more than 250 corporate members collectively manage over £7.7 trillion on behalf of clients in the UK and around the world.

History
The IMA was established in 2002 after a merger of the Association of Unit Trust and Investment Funds (AUTIF) and the Fund Managers Association. 

AUTIF, before 1993, was itself known as the Unit Trust Association and was established in 1959.

Renaming
In 2015, the trade body Investment Management Association was renamed the Investment Association, following the merger between the IMA and the Investment Affairs division of the Association of British Insurers.

References

External links
Official Website
Digital Assets Investment
Whatsminer M30S+ Specifications

Institutional investors
Finance industry associations
Trade associations based in the United Kingdom